T. Krishna Kumari (6 March 1933 – 24 January 2018) was an Indian actress. She worked predominantly in Telugu films, in addition to Tamil and Kannada films in the 1950s and 1960s. She was the sister of noted actress Sowkar Janaki.

She starred in over 150 films in her career, most notably Pichi Pullayya (1953), Bangaru Papa (1955), Vinayaka Chaviti (1957), Pelli Kanuka (1960), Devanthakudu (1960), Bharya Bhartalu (1961), Vagdanam (1961), Kula Gotralu (1962), Chaduvukunna Ammayilu (1963), Bandipotu (1963), Punarjanma (1963 film), Aggi Pidugu (1964), Doctor Chakravarty (1964), Gudi Gantalu (1964), Antastulu (1965), Chikkadu Dorakadu (1967),Tikka Sankarayya (1968), Neramu Siksha (1973).

Early life
Krishna Kumari was born on 6 March 1933 a Telugu and Kannada-speaking Madhwa Brahmin family at Naihati, West Bengal to T. Venkoji Rao and Sachi Devi. Her family hails from Rajahmundry, Andhra Pradesh. Owing her father's work, Kumari was schooled at Rajahmundry, Madras, Assam and Calcutta. She completed her matriculation is Assam. Her sister, Sowkar Janaki is also an actress.

Career
T. Krishna Kumari started her career at the age of 17 with a small role in the Telugu film Pathala Bhairavi (1951). She later played the role of a heroine for the first time in Navvithe Navaratnalu (1951). She featured as leading actress in several Tamil movies, notably Thirumbi Paar (1953), Manithan (1953), Azhagi (1953), Pudhu Yugam (1954), Viduthalai (1954) and Thuli Visham (1954).

Krishna Kumari then began to focus on Telugu cinema, which propelled her to stardom. Her movies Pelli Meeda Pelli (1959), Bharya Bhartalu (1961), Vagdanam (1961), Kulagothralu (1962), Gudi Gantalu (1964) remain some of Telugu cinema's classics.

In the early 1960s, Krishna Kumari entered the Kannada film industry briefly, choosing to return to her preferred Telugu cinema within years. But in the short span of 5–6 years, she gave memorable performances, most of them co-starring Dr. Rajkumar. In fact, her first ever award was for the Rajkumar starrer, Bhaktha Kanakadasa (1960).

In Hindi, she acted in Kabhi Andhera Kabhi Ujala (1958). She was rechristened Rati but again, Hindi cinema held no attraction for Krishna Kumari. Although she had several offers in Hindi cinema, she returned to Madras. Her most successful movies have been with Akkineni Nageswara Rao, N. T. Rama Rao and also several mythological roles with Kantha Rao.

Krishna Kumari acted in 150 Telugu films, and about 30 Tamil and Kannada films. Her repertoire won her fans across Telugu states and the President's Award. Her co-stars include N.T. Rama Rao, Akkineni Nageswara Rao, Krishnam Raju, Dr. Rajkumar, Sivaji Ganesan, Kanta Rao, and Jaggayya.

Personal life
In 1969, Krishna Kumari married Ajay Mohan Khaitan, a businessman and journalist who had previously served as Editor of the Indian Express and was the founder of two magazines, Screen and Businessman. Ajay Mohan Khaitan had previously been married to another lady also named Krishna, who was the daughter of Ramnath Goenka, founder and owner of The Indian Express. By his previous marriage, Ajay Mohan Khaitan was the father of two sons, including Vivek, who was adopted by Ramnath Goenka and given the name Viveck Goenka; he is presently running The Indian Express.

After marriage, Krishna Kumari chose to step away from the arclights and moved to her husband's farmhouse near Bangalore, where she devoted herself to her family and developed her interests in cooking and gardening. Krishna Kumari and Khaitan had a daughter, Dipika; according to some reports, Dipika was adopted by the couple. Dipika married Vikram Maiya, the son of the Maiya family which owns the famous MTR restaurant in Bangalore and the MTR brand of ready-to-eat foods.

Ajay Mohan Khaitan died in 2012 aged 85. Krishna Kumari continued to live at her farmhouse in Bengaluru with her daughter, son-in-law and grandson.

Death 
Krishna Kumari died on 24 January 2018, in Bangalore from bone marrow cancer.

Filmography

In popular culture
 Krishna Kumari was portrayed by actress Pranitha Subhash in the 2019 biographical film NTR: Kathanayakudu, based on the real life and acting career of N. T. Rama Rao.

References

External links
 

1933 births
2018 deaths
Indian film actresses
Actresses in Kannada cinema
20th-century Indian actresses
Actresses in Telugu cinema
Actresses in Malayalam cinema
People from North 24 Parganas district
Actresses from West Bengal
Deaths from cancer in India
Deaths from bone cancer
Deaths from multiple myeloma
Actresses in Tamil cinema
Telugu actresses
Madhva Brahmins